Women Talking may refer to:

 Women Talking (novel), a 2018 novel by Miriam Toews
 Women Talking (film), a 2022 film adaptation of the novel
 Women Talking (soundtrack), a score album composed by Hildur Guðnadóttir for the film

See also 
 Bechdel test, a measure of the representation of women talking in films.